Giacomo Caccin (born 21 March 1997) is an Italian footballer who currently plays as a midfielder for Este PD.

Club career
Caccin made his Serie B debut for Cittadella on 26 August 2017 in a game against Ascoli.

For the 2019–20 season, he joined Mestre.

References

External links
 

1997 births
Sportspeople from the Province of Padua
Footballers from Veneto
Living people
Italian footballers
Association football midfielders
Italy youth international footballers
A.S. Cittadella players
A.C. Renate players
Serie B players
Serie C players